Machuca is a Spanish and Portuguese surname. Notable people with the surname include:

Alexis Machuca (born 1990), Argentine footballer
Anggello Machuca (born 1984), Paraguayan footballer
Edgar Machuca (born 1989), Paraguayan footballer
Juan Machuca (born 1951), Chilean footballer
Manuel Machuca (1924–1985), Chilean footballer
Pedro Machuca (died 1550), Spanish architect
Santiago Machuca (born 1929), Puerto Rican sport shooter

See also
Juan R. Melecio Machuca, Puerto Rican lawyer

References

Spanish-language surnames
Portuguese-language surnames